Yuan Tengfei (born February 8, 1972, in Beijing), is a historian, and was a history teacher in the People's Republic of China. His fans gave him the nickname "the most awesome history teacher in history" for his entertaining and comedic lectures, which include commentating on historical events and the motives of the event causers,  and an article in The New York Times Fan Meizhong, another Chinese high school history teacher describes Yuan as asking "They didn't begin telling the truth in the Soviet Union until after it collapsed, did they?" He had been also a popular guest in Lecture Room of CCTV. Additionally, he released several books based on his history lectures in classrooms and on TV.

Yuan graduated from Capital Normal University with a major in Chinese history, and had since been teaching Chinese history in various Beijing high schools. He came to popular attention when videos of his history courses were posted online in 2008. The videos were classroom recordings made by a Beijing cram school, for which Yuan was moonlighting, and made available online behind the school's paywall. The videos were copied, presumably without any authorization, and posted to other free video-sharing websites.

Although Yuan is not a political dissident, his lectures on modern Chinese history covered sensitive topics such as the Great Chinese Famine and the Cultural Revolution in details that are not ordinarily required in the history curriculum in China. In particular, he is deeply critical of Mao Zedong and his policies. Yuan called Mao one of the "three great despots" of the 20th century, rivalled by only Hitler and Stalin; he also once called the Mao Zedong Mausoleum in Tiananmen Square "China's Yasukuni Shrine". His lectures on such topics became an object of government attention and attacks from leftist conservatives, including threats of lawsuits for defamation.

Yuan has quit teaching position and signed contract with TaixueTV. He broadcast many online videos about historical topics and travelling programs.

Publications

《历史是个什么玩意儿1 —— 袁腾飞说中国史上》
《历史是个什么玩意儿2 —— 袁腾飞说中国史下》
《历史是个什么玩意儿3 —— 袁腾飞说世界史上》
《历史是个什么玩意儿4 —— 袁腾飞说世界史下》

References

External links

Yuan's lectures at Lecture Room's official website (Chinese)
Yuan's bio from Jinghua School's website. 

1972 births
Chinese YouTubers
Educators from Beijing
Writers from Beijing
Capital Normal University alumni
Living people
People in history occupations
Chinese schoolteachers